Amcom may refer to:

 United States Army Aviation and Missile Command (AMCOM)
 Amcom Telecommunications, an Australian company